Datuk Limus bin Jury (born 26 July 1961) is a Malaysian politician who has served as the State Assistant Minister of Works of Sabah in the Gabungan Rakyat Sabah (GRS) state administration under Chief Minister Hajiji Noor and Ministers Bung Moktar Radin and Shahelmey Yahya since October 2020 as well as Member of the Sabah State Legislative Assembly (MLA) for Kuala Penyu since May 2013. He is a member of the Parti Gagasan Rakyat Sabah (GAGASAN), which is a component party of the GRS coalition.

Election results

Honours 
  :
  Commander of the Order of Kinabalu (PGDK) - Datuk (2017)

References

Members of the Sabah State Legislative Assembly
Malaysian United Indigenous Party politicians
Living people
1961 births